Manupeu Tanah Daru National Park is located on the island of Sumba in Indonesia. This national park consists lowland forests on steep slopes that rise up to ca. 600m.

Flora and fauna
There are about 118 plant species protected in this national park including Toona sureni, Sterculia foetida, Schleichera oleosa, Alstonia scholaris (ditabark), Tamarind, candlenut, Syzygium species, Casuarina species, and Lantana camara (Spanish flag).

There are also 87 species of birds protected in this region, with 7 bird taxa endemic to the island of Sumba. These are Sumba yellow-crested cockatoo, Sumba green pigeon, Sumba flycatcher, Sumba cicadabird, apricot-breasted sunbird and Sumba hornbill.

57 species of butterflies are also protected here, 7 of them are endemic to this island. These are Papilio neumoegenii, Ideopsis oberthurii, Delias fasciata, Junonia adulatrix, Athyma karita, Sumalia chilo, and Elimnia amoena.

See also

 Geography of Indonesia
 Wanokaka River

References

External links
Official website

National parks of Indonesia
Lesser Sunda Islands
Geography of Sumba
Geography of East Nusa Tenggara
Tourist attractions in East Nusa Tenggara